Guangzhou Changlong railway station is a station on Foshan-Dongguan intercity railway located in Panyu District, Guangzhou, Guangdong, China. The station was officially named as Guangzhou Changlong in November 2020. The station opened in 2021.

References 

Railway stations in Guangdong